Caledonia Place is a late 18th-century terrace of 31 Georgian houses, located between West Mall and Princess Victoria Street in the Clifton area of Bristol. The postcode is within the Clifton ward and electoral division, which is in the constituency of Bristol West.

History

Caledonia Place was completed in 1843 by  architects T Foster and W Okely, The area has Grade II listed buildings and has mid Georgian style. Each three storey house has an attic and basement and has rear elevations differentiated by fine cast-iron Grecian balconies. In 1852, Lord Macaulay once lived at number 16 Caledonia Place.

Numbers 32 to 44 Caledonia Place was completed in 1788 to the design of Bath architect and surveyor, John Eveleigh. The central and end houses of the terrace are pedimented and broken forward with the variation giving the terrace a palatial appearance. Numbers 43 and 44 were converted into one in 1922 to form a bank.

In February 2015, Residents complained about the introduction of a Residents Parking Zone by George Ferguson and Bristol City Council complained about the attachment of signs to the railings outside listed buildings.

The Mall, one of Clifton’s thriving commercial thoroughfares, and to the southern end of the terrace is the Avon Gorge and Clifton Suspension Bridge are close by.

References

Houses completed in 1788
Grade II* listed buildings in Bristol
Streets in Bristol
Clifton, Bristol
1788 establishments in England